Bowsher v. Synar, 478 U.S. 714 (1986), was a United States Supreme Court case that struck down the Gramm–Rudman–Hollings Act as an unconstitutional usurpation of executive power by Congress because the law empowered Congress to terminate the United States Comptroller General for certain specified reasons, including "inefficiency, 'neglect of duty,' or 'malfeasance.'" The named defendant in the original case was Comptroller General Charles Arthur Bowsher and the constitutional challenge was brought forth by Oklahoma Congressman Mike Synar.

Facts
Under the Gramm–Rudman–Hollings Act, allowable deficit levels were calculated in consideration of the eventual elimination of the federal deficit. If the budget exceeded the allowable deficit, across-the-board cuts were required. Directors of the Office of Management and Budget (OMB) and the Congressional Budget Office (CBO) were required to report to the Comptroller General regarding their recommendations for how much must be cut. The Comptroller General then evaluated these reports, made his own conclusion, and gave a recommendation to the President, who was then required to issue an order effecting the reductions recommended by the Comptroller General unless Congress made the cuts in other ways within a specified amount of time.

The Comptroller General is nominated by the President from a list of three people recommended by the presiding officers of the House and Senate. He is removable only by impeachment or a joint resolution of Congress, which requires majority votes in both houses and is subject to a Presidential veto. Congress can give a number of reasons for this removal, including "inefficiency," "neglect of duty," or "malfeasance".

Holding
The Supreme Court ruled that Congress cannot control how its laws are executed. Since it does not possess this power, it cannot delegate it to its agents. The Comptroller General is an agent of Congress because he can be removed by Congress via a process other than impeachment. The Comptroller General exercises executive power and so the Act is unconstitutional.

The Comptroller General's function under the Act is the "very essence" of the execution of the laws since (1) it entails interpreting the Act to determine precisely what kind of budgetary calculations are required and (2) the Comptroller General commands the President to carry out, without variation, his directive regarding the budget resolutions. Once Congress passes legislation, it can influence only its execution by passing new laws or through impeachment.

The Constitution provides Congress the power to remove executive officers only by impeachment. Also, the Constitutional Convention explicitly rejected language that would have permitted impeachment for "maladministration," with Madison arguing that "so vague a term will be equivalent to a tenure during pleasure of the Senate". Thus, Congress can remove a member of the executive branch only through impeachment.

Dissent
Justice White's dissent argued that the act should have been upheld. He argued that determining the level of spending by the federal government is a legislative function, not an executive one. Even if the power were executive, White did not see anything wrong with delegating that power to an agent as long as Congress could influence him only by a means that is subject to Presentment Clause and Bicameralism Clause requirements, which the act satisfied, since the Comptroller General could be influenced by Congress only through a joint resolution.

See also
 List of United States Supreme Court cases, volume 478
 List of United States Supreme Court cases
 Lists of United States Supreme Court cases by volume
 List of United States Supreme Court cases by the Rehnquist Court
 Immigration and Naturalization Service v. Chadha (1983)

References

External links

United States Supreme Court cases
United States Supreme Court cases of the Burger Court
United States administrative case law
1986 in United States case law
Appointments Clause case law
United States separation of powers case law